An Inn at Osaka is a 1954 Japanese drama and shomin-geki film directed by Heinosuke Gosho. It is based on the novel of the same name by Takitarō Minakami and was produced by Gosho's own production company Studio Eight. Film historians regard An Inn at Osaka as one of Gosho's major, but also darker works.

Plot
After his reassignment to Osaka due to an argument with his superior, Tokyo businessman Mita is residing in a cheap inn as his salary won't allow for better accommodation. Though rather a reclusive person, he tries to help the housemaidens with their monetary problems (including a solitary mother and the wife of an unemployed worker), while geisha Uwabami tries to awaken his interest, but to no avail. In the end, Mita, who is critical of his new superior's reckless business practices which result in a business partner's suicide, is transferred again. During the goodbye ceremony, Mita reminds the participants, who all missed their intended goals in one way ore another, to "have the dignity to laugh in the face of unhappiness".

Cast
 Shūji Sano as Kyōichi Mita
 Toshio Hosokawa as Tawara
 Nobuko Otowa as Uwabami
 Mitsuko Mito as Orika
 Hiroko Kawasaki as Otsugi
 Sachiko Hidari as Oyone
 Eiko Miyoshi as inn keeper
 Kamatari Fujiwara as Ossan
 Kyōko Anzai as Omitsu
 Haruo Tanaka 
 Jun Tatara 
 Hisao Toake 
 Zekō Nakamura 
 Akira Nakamura 
 Hyō Kitazawa 
 Michiko Megumi 
 Toranosuke Ogawa

References

External links
 
 

1954 films
1954 drama films
Japanese drama films
Films based on Japanese novels
Films directed by Heinosuke Gosho
Japanese black-and-white films
1950s Japanese films